Chengalpet Gnaneshwar (born 15 October 1997) is an Indian cricketer. He made his first-class debut for Andhra in the 2018–19 Ranji Trophy on 14 December 2018, scoring a century in the second innings. He made his List A debut on 26 February 2021, for Andhra in the 2020–21 Vijay Hazare Trophy.

References

External links
 

1997 births
Living people
Indian cricketers
Andhra cricketers